Shaʽban is the eighth month of the Islamic calendar. It is called the month of "separation", as the word means "to disperse" or "to separate" because the pagan Arabs used to disperse in search of water.

The fifteenth night of this month is known as the "Night of Records" (Laylat al-Bara'at).

Sha'ban is the last lunar month before Ramadan, and so Muslims determine in it when the first day of Ramadan fasting will be. In the second Hijri year (624), Ramadan Fasting was made obligatory during this month.

In the post-Tanzimat Ottoman Empire context, the word was, in French, the main language of diplomacy and a common language among educated and among non-Muslim subjects, spelled Chaban. The current Turkish spelling today is Şâban.

Virtues 

The virtues of Sha'ban is mentioned in various traditions of the Islamic prophet Muhammad.

Aisha, the wife of Muhammad, narrated that "(she) did not see him fasting in any month more than in the month of Sha'ban," except Ramadan.

In another narration the Prophet Muhammad said, "Do those deeds which you can do easily, as Allah will not get tired (of giving rewards) till you get bored and tired (of performing religious deeds)."

Timing 

The Islamic calendar is a lunar calendar, and months begin when the first crescent of a new moon is sighted. Since the Islamic lunar calendar year is 11 to 12 days shorter than the solar year, Sha'ban migrates throughout the seasons. The estimated start and end dates for Sha'ban, based on the Umm al-Qura calendar of Saudi Arabia, are:

Islamic events
 01 Sha'ban, birth of Zaynab bint Ali.
 02 Sha'ban, death of (Imam Azam) Abu Hanifa.
 03 Sha'ban, birth of Husayn ibn Ali.
 04 Sha'ban, birth of Abbas ibn Ali.
 05 Sha'ban, birth of Ali ibn Husayn.
 05 Sha'ban, death of Fizza, the hand-maiden (Qaneez) of Fatimah.
 07 Sha'ban, birth of Qasim ibn Hasan.
 11 Sha'ban, birth of Ali al-Akbar ibn Husayn.
 15 Sha'ban, holiday known as Laylat al-Bara'at or Nisfu Sha'ban; birth of Muhammad al-Mahdi.
 21 Sha'ban, passing away of Lal Shahbaz Qalandar.
 22 Sha'ban, death of Muhammad Usman Damani.
 27 Sha'ban, Death of Sayyad Laal Shah Hamdani
27 Sha’ban, birth of Eissa Hussain Allaqband ibn

See also
 Islamic calendar
 Mid-Sha'ban

References

External links
Islamic-Western Calendar Converter (Based on the Arithmetical or Tabular Calendar)

8
Islamic terminology